Second Dawn is a role-playing game published by rba Enterprises in 1988.

Description
Second Dawn is a fantasy system that embraces both magic and scientific technology. The game includes almost 50 character classes, combat rules, a magic system with over 800 spells, and 400 monsters.

Publication history
Second Dawn was designed by Arthur Wiederhold with George J. Herget, and published by rba Enterprises in 1988 as a 108-page book.

Reception

References

Role-playing games introduced in 1988
Science fantasy role-playing games